Dohlmann is a surname. Notable people with the surname include: 

Augusta Dohlmann (1847–1914), Danish painter
Helen Dohlmann (1870–1942), Danish sculptor

See also
Dohmann